Romanoa is the generic name of two groups of organisms, and may refer to:

 Romanoa , a genus of plants in the family Euphorbiaceae
 Romanoa , a genus of fungi in the family Clavicipitaceae